La Vallée may refer to:

 La Vallée, Charente-Maritime, a town in France
 La Vallée, Haiti, a municipality in Haiti
 La Vallée District, Switzerland
 La Vallee, Ontario, Canada
 La Vallee, United States Virgin Islands
 La Vallée (film), a 1972 French film
 * Obscured by Clouds, soundtrack to the film by English rock band Pink Floyd

See also
Vallée (disambiguation)